Jahbari Willis (born July 25, 1990) is an American soccer player who currently plays for Atlanta Silverbacks in the North American Soccer League.

References

External links
 Atlanta Silverbacks bio
 Florida International University bio

1990 births
Living people
American soccer players
FIU Panthers men's soccer players
Atlanta Silverbacks players
Fort Lauderdale Strikers players
North American Soccer League players
Association football forwards